Siseh Garag-e Olya (also Romanized as Sīseh Garag-e ‘Olyā; also known as Sīseh Garag-e Bālā) is a village in Sepidar Rural District, in the Central District of Boyer-Ahmad County, Kohgiluyeh and Boyer-Ahmad Province, Iran. At the 2006 census, its population was 131, in 29 families.

References 

Populated places in Boyer-Ahmad County